Rear Admiral James Anthony Morse, is a retired senior Royal Navy officer who served as Assistant Chief of Naval Staff (Capability) and Controller of the Navy.

Early life and education
Morse was educated at the University of Bristol (BSc, 1985) and King's College London (MA International Relations, 2007).

Naval career
Morse joined the Royal Navy in 1982. He was given command of the Bristol University Royal Naval Unit and then the patrol craft  in 1991. After attending the principal warfare officer's course in 1993, he became operations officer in the frigate . Having attended the specialist navigating officer's course, he became squadron navigator of the Fourth Frigate Squadron and was then given command of the frigate  in 1997. He joined the Permanent Joint Headquarters in 1999 and was then made commanding officer of the frigate  before becoming executive officer of the aircraft carrier  in November 2001. He went on to be Naval Assistant to the First Sea Lord in 2004 and, after attending the Joint Services Command and Staff College, he became commanding officer of the frigate  in August 2005.

Morse became Director of Force Development in September 2007, Commander United Kingdom Task Group in December 2008 and liaison officer to the Chairman of the US Joint Chiefs of Staff in September 2011. He went on to be Commandant of the Joint Services Command and Staff College in August 2012, and Assistant Chief of Naval Staff (Capability) and Controller of the Navy in September 2014. Morse handed over his duty to Rear Admiral Paul Bennett on 23 May 2016.

Morse was appointed a Companion of the Order of the Bath in the 2016 New Year Honours. He retired from the Royal Navy later that year and became President of the Rabdan Academy in Abu Dhabi in August 2016.

References

|-

Year of birth missing (living people)
Living people
Alumni of the University of Bristol
Alumni of King's College London
Royal Navy rear admirals
Companions of the Order of the Bath